Constanze Engelbrecht (6 January 1950 – 21 July 2000) was a German actress who was one of the most popular actresses in the country between 1980 and 1990. She appeared in more than seventy films from 1960 to 1998. Her husband was an actor, and her daughter Julie Engelbrecht is an actress.

Biography 
Constanze Engelbrecht was born on 6 January 1950 in Munich, Germany to actress  and sculptor Gen Golch. Her very first role was the voice actress for the character "Jeff" in the German version of the TV series Lassie, which she performed for six years. She debuted as a television actress at ten years old in the TV movie Und nicht mehr Jessica (1965) with Horst Naumann and Sascha Hehn. Engelbrecht's original goal was to become a classical soprano and she studied at the Richard Strauss Conservatory of Munich, at the Salzburg Mozarteneum and finally at the Guildhall School of Music and Drama in London before changing to acting and studying under the direction of Rosemarie Fendel. She performed in both live theater and television. Engelbrecht was well known at the theaters of Munich and also performed in Paris at the "Theatre de la ville".

Beginning in the 1970s, she worked in television, playing in Derrick, The Old Fox, Tatort and in 1979 she appeared as Gabrielle d'Estrées in a 12-part historical drama Heinrich, der gute König. In 1980, she and her husband, French writer, director and actor , moved to Paris, but she continued to act in German television.

Between 1987 and 1990 Engelbrecht became known throughout Germany as Brigitte Sanders for the role she played in the television series in Diese Drombuschs. She was the devious ex-wife of Martin Sanders (played by Michael Degen), who will do whatever she can to destroy the new relationship her ex-husband is having with Vera Drombusch (played by Witta Pohl). In 1990, she made a television film, Der Eindringling which was one of her most acclaimed performances. Throughout the 1990s, she worked in television completing the miniseries Die Frauen von Bonne Espérance (1990) and several successful series like Eurocops (1990), The Old Fox (1991), Ein Fall für zwei (1992), Freunde fürs Leben (1993), Praxis Bülowbogen (1994), Schlosshotel Orth (1997), among others. Her last role was with Gerard Depardieu in a television production of The Count of Monte Cristo.

Engelbrecht died on 21 July 2000 at the Frauenklinik des Roten Kreuzes Hospital in Munich. She had been fighting breast cancer since 1998 and it had spread to the liver and brain.

Filmography

References

External links 
 

1950 births
2000 deaths
German film actresses
German television actresses
20th-century German actresses
Actresses from Munich
Deaths from cancer in Germany
Deaths from breast cancer